Kenan Mutapčić (born 6 November 1979) is a Bosnian rugby union  football player based in France. He plays as a prop.

Mutapčić was attached to US Bressane but switched to Grenoble in the French Rugby Pro D2 division during the 2009-10 season.

He plays for Bosnia and Herzegovina.

References

1979 births
Living people
Bosnia and Herzegovina rugby union players
Rugby union props
Place of birth missing (living people)
Bosnia and Herzegovina expatriate rugby union players
Expatriate rugby union players in France
Bosnia and Herzegovina expatriate sportspeople in France